Pseudopolionota radians is a species of tephritid or fruit flies in the genus Pseudopolionota of the family Tephritidae.

Distribution
Brazil.

References

Tephritinae
Insects described in 1937
Diptera of South America